Sulphur Mountain is a mountain in Banff National Park in the Canadian Rocky Mountains overlooking the town of Banff, Alberta, Canada.

The mountain was named in 1916 for the hot springs on its lower slopes.  George Dawson had referred to this landform as Terrace Mountain on his 1886 map of the area. Sanson's Peak was named in 1948 for Norman Bethune Sanson who diligently attended the observatory recording equipment atop Sulphur Mountain for nearly 30 years.

Recreation

Two hot springs have been commercially developed.  The lowest is the Cave and Basin National Historic Site and the highest is the Banff Upper Hot Springs.

A gondola on the eastern slope goes to the summit ridge which has an upper terminal containing three restaurants, a gift shop, and multiple observation decks. The summit ridge provides views both westward up and east down the Bow Valley. A boardwalk can be followed on the north side to the top of Sanson's Peak.

The original, and more scenic, summit access is along an old fire road (Sanson Road) on the Southwest face of the mountain with a distance of 5.8 km from the Banff Sundance Canyon trail system near the Bow River.  Another 5.4 km switchback trail route exists under the gondola with trailhead access from the Banff Hot Springs parking lot near the gondola terminal.

Scientific importance 

The mountain has been the site of two research facilities. In 1903, a meteorological observatory building was completed atop Sanson Peak. This building still exists and visitors can look through a window to see its interior complete with rustic furnishings. In the winter of 1956-57, the National Research Council built a small laboratory on Sanson's Peak in order to study cosmic rays as part of Canada's contribution to the International Geophysical Year (IGY). The Sulphur Mountain Cosmic Ray Station remained in operation until 1978 and the building was removed in 1981. A plaque now marks the site's location.

The hot springs at the base of Sulphur Mountain are home to the endangered Banff Springs snail and the now-extinct Banff longnose dace.

References

External links

 Banff Gondola
 Hike Description

Two-thousanders of Alberta
Alberta's Rockies